Petre Mshvenieradze (24 March 1929 – 3 June 2003) was a Soviet and Georgian water polo player who competed for the Soviet Union in the 1952, 1956 and 1960 Summer Olympics.

He was born in Tbilisi, Georgian SSR, and died in Moscow, Russia. He is the father of water polo players Giorgi and Nuzgari.

In 1952, he was a member of the Soviet team which finished seventh in the Olympic water polo tournament. He played all nine matches and scored at least one goal (not all scorers are known).

Four years later at the 1956 Summer Olympics in Melbourne, he won the bronze medal with the Soviet team. He played all seven matches. However, that year there was an incident that became known as the Blood in the Water match. The semi-final against the Hungarian team took place on the same days as the bloody events in Budapest. The match saw Hungary beat the USSR with a score of 4–0; although, a minute before the final whistle, the infamous fight errupted; and afterwards, without replaying the last moments, the Hungarians were declared winners due to having led before the incident.

At the 1960 Summer Olympics in Rome, he was part of the Soviet team which won the silver medal in the Olympic water polo tournament. He played all seven matches and scored five goals.

See also
 List of Olympic medalists in water polo (men)

References

External links
 

1929 births
2003 deaths
Sportspeople from Tbilisi
Soviet male water polo players
Male water polo players from Georgia (country)
Olympic water polo players of the Soviet Union
Water polo players at the 1952 Summer Olympics
Water polo players at the 1956 Summer Olympics
Water polo players at the 1960 Summer Olympics
Olympic silver medalists for the Soviet Union
Olympic bronze medalists for the Soviet Union
Olympic medalists in water polo
Medalists at the 1960 Summer Olympics
Medalists at the 1956 Summer Olympics
Burials in Troyekurovskoye Cemetery